Cedar Township is a township in Muscatine County, Iowa, in the United States.

History
Cedar Township was organized in 1842. The Cedar River forms its western boundary.

References

Townships in Muscatine County, Iowa
Townships in Iowa
1842 establishments in Iowa Territory